The river Eridanos  or Eridanus is a river in northern Europe mentioned in Greek mythology and historiography.

Mythical stream 
Hesiod, in the Theogony, calls it "deep-eddying Eridanos" in his list of rivers, the offspring of the Titans Tethys and her brother-husband Oceanus. He was called the king of the rivers.

Herodotus suspects the word Eridanos to be essentially Greek in character, and notably forged by some unknown poet, and expresses his disbelief in the whole concept—passed on to him by others, themselves not eye witnesses—of such a river flowing into a northern sea, surrounding Europe, where the mythical Amber and Tin Isles were supposed; he upholds the belief in the abundance of natural goods at the world's ends though, to be found in the north of Europe as well as in India (east: big animals, gold, cotton) and Arabia (south: incense, myrrh, etc.). The Eridanos was later associated with the river Po, because the Po was located near the end of the Amber Trail.

According to Apollonius of Rhodes and Ovid, amber originated from the tears of the Heliades, encased in poplars as dryads, shed when their brother, Phaethon, died and fell from the sky, struck by Zeus' thunderbolt, and tumbled into the Eridanos,  where "to this very day the marsh exhales a heavy vapour which rises from his smouldering wound; no bird can stretch out its fragile wings to fly over that water, but in mid-flight it falls dead in the flames"; "along the green banks of the river Eridanos," Cygnus mourned him—Ovid told—and was transformed into a swan. There in the far west, Heracles asked the river nymphs of Eridanos to help him locate the Garden of the Hesperides. Strabo commented disregardingly on such mythmaking:
[...] one must put aside many of the mythical or false accounts such as those of Phaethon and of the Heliades changed into black poplars near the Eridanos (a river that does not exist anywhere on earth, although it is said to be near the Po), and of the Islands of Amber that lie off the Po, and of the guinea-fowl on them, because none of these exist in this area.                                                     

[...] τὰ δὲ πολλὰ τῶν μυθευομένων ἢ κατεψευσμένων ἄλλως ἐᾶν δεῖ͵ οἷον τὰ περὶ Φαέθοντα καὶ τὰς Ἡλιάδας τὰς ἀπαιγειρουμένας περὶ τὸν Ἠριδανόν͵ τὸν μηδαμοῦ γῆς ὄντα͵ πλησίον δὲ τοῦ Πάδου λεγόμενον͵ καὶ τὰς Ἠλεκτρίδας νήσους τὰς πρὸ τοῦ Πάδου καὶ μελεαγρίδας ἐν αὐταῖς· οὐδὲ γὰρ τούτων οὐδέν ἐστιν ἐν τοῖς τόποις.Virgil introduced it as one of the rivers of Hades in his Aeneid.

"Starry Eridanus"

When in Nonnus' fourth- or fifth-century CE Dionysiaca the vast monster Typhon boasts that he will bathe in "starry Eridanus", it is hyperbole, for the constellation Eridanus, represented as a river, was one of the 48 constellations listed by the second-century astronomer Ptolemy; it remains one of the 88 modern constellations.

Real river
There have been various guesses at which real river was the Eridanos: these include the Po River in north Italy, the Rhone in France and the Rhine. The Eridanos is mentioned in Greek writings as a river in northern Europe rich in amber (Vistula on Amber Road?). A small river near Athens was named Eridanos in ancient times, and has been rediscovered with the excavations for construction of the Athens Metro.

Legacy

Cenozoic river

Eridanos is the name that has been applied by geologists to a river which flowed where the Baltic Sea is now, a river system also known simply as the "Baltic River System".

Namesake
Eridanus Stream in Antarctica is named after the mythical river.

Notes

References 

 Apollonius Rhodius, Argonautica translated by Robert Cooper Seaton (1853-1915), R. C. Loeb Classical Library Volume 001. London, William Heinemann Ltd, 1912. Online version at the Topos Text Project.
 Apollonius Rhodius, Argonautica. George W. Mooney. London. Longmans, Green. 1912. Greek text available at the Perseus Digital Library.
 Herodotus, The Histories with an English translation by A. D. Godley. Cambridge. Harvard University Press. 1920. . Online version at the Topos Text Project. Greek text available at Perseus Digital Library.
 Hesiod, Theogony from The Homeric Hymns and Homerica with an English Translation by Hugh G. Evelyn-White, Cambridge, MA.,Harvard University Press; London, William Heinemann Ltd. 1914. Online version at the Perseus Digital Library. Greek text available from the same website.
 Publius Ovidius Naso, Metamorphoses translated by Brookes More (1859-1942). Boston, Cornhill Publishing Co. 1922. Online version at the Perseus Digital Library.
 Publius Ovidius Naso, Metamorphoses. Hugo Magnus. Gotha (Germany). Friedr. Andr. Perthes. 1892. Latin text available at the Perseus Digital Library.
 Publius Vergilius Maro, Aeneid. Theodore C. Williams. trans. Boston. Houghton Mifflin Co. 1910. Online version at the Perseus Digital Library.
 Publius Vergilius Maro, Bucolics, Aeneid, and Georgics. J. B. Greenough. Boston. Ginn & Co. 1900. Latin text available at the Perseus Digital Library.
 Publius Vergilius Maro, Bucolics, Aeneid, and Georgics of Vergil. J. B. Greenough. Boston. Ginn & Co. 1900. Online version at the Perseus Digital Library.
Strabo, The Geography of Strabo. Edition by H.L. Jones. Cambridge, Mass.: Harvard University Press; London: William Heinemann, Ltd. 1924. Online version at the Perseus Digital Library.
 Strabo, Geographica edited by A. Meineke. Leipzig: Teubner. 1877. Greek text available at the Perseus Digital Library.

Further reading 

 Aken, Dr. A.R.A. van. (1961). Elseviers Mythologische Encyclopedie. Amsterdam: Elsevier.
 Bartelink, Dr. G.J.M. (1988). Prisma van de mythologie. Utrecht: Het Spectrum.

External links
 

Rivers of Hades
Potamoi